Jimmy Anak Ahar (born 3 November 1981) is a Bruneian athlete. He was the sole competitor for Brunei at the 2004 Summer Olympics, running in the 1500 metres.

Personal life
His elder brother Sefli is also a long-distance runner while his younger brother Philip is a Bruneian international football player.

See also
 List of middle-distance runners

References

External links
 

Place of birth missing (living people)
1981 births
20th-century Asian people
21st-century Asian people
Athletes (track and field) at the 2004 Summer Olympics
Living people
Olympic athletes of Brunei
Bruneian male middle-distance runners